The second season of the reality television show Storage Wars aired on A&E from July 20, 2011, to  March 4, 2012. It consisted of 33 episodes, beginning with the episode "Hang Em' High Desert" and ending with the episode "Highland Anxiety".

All of the episodes this season were filmed at various self-storage facilities throughout Southern California, including Mini-U Storage, Storage Outlet and Extra Storage.

Episode overview
{|class="wikitable plainrowheaders" style="width:100%; margin:auto; background:#FFF;"
|-
!  style="width:10%; background:#9C3434; color:#fff;"|No. inseries 
!  style="width:10%; background:#9C3434; color:#fff;"|No. inseason 
!  style="width:50%; background:#9C3434; color:#fff;"|Title
!  style="width:20%; background:#9C3434; color:#fff;"|Location
!  style="width:20%; background:#9C3434; color:#fff;"|Original air date
|-

|}

Episode statistics
Although revealed at the end of the episode, the totals are not always reflective and exact of the value of items in the lockers. For example, in the episode "Fu Dog Day Afternoon", Barry found an art piece worth $6,000, but he was given a credit of zero because he intended to keep it. In many cases, the values of items are estimates made on the spot by the cast members, and are not necessarily actual profits or losses. Some of the episodes were not aired in the order that they were filmed. Therefore, the * column in each season's episode list indicates the sequential order of that episode.

Notes
 1 Although Jarrod and Brandi didn't buy a unit, he earned $100 after winning a coin flip against Darrell.
 2 Dave did not buy any units, but instead bought two bikes from a unit. It was not revealed how much profit he made.
 3 Although Jarrod and Brandi didn't buy a unit, he earned $100 after being paid to crack open a safe for Barry.

Other Notes
 In "Enemy Of The Enemy", Mark Balelo spent $9,375 on five lockers.
 In "Fire In The Hole", Mark Balelo did not score a locker.
 In "San Burrito", Mark Balelo spent $925 and lost $105.
 In "Smoke 'Em If You Find 'Em", Nabila Haniss spent $450 and made a profit of $425.
 In "The Drone Wars", Nabila Haniss did not score a locker.
 In "Not Your Average Bear", Nabila Haniss spent $500 and made a profit of $1,230.
 In "Hook Line and Sucker", Nabila Haniss spent $425 and lost $45.
 In "Operation Hobo", Nabila Haniss did not score a locker.

References

External links
 Storage Wars Zap2it Episode List
 Mini-U Storage
 Extra Storage

Season 2